Ceres is a village in Fife, Scotland, located in a small glen approximately  over the Ceres Moor from Cupar and  from St Andrews. The former parish of that name included the settlements of Baldinnie, Chance Inn, Craigrothie, Pitscottie and Tarvit Mill.

Village
Ceres is one of a few Scottish villages to have a village green. It is known as the "Bow Butts" since its use as an archery practice ground in medieval times. The Ceres Burn runs through the village and alongside the green. An old packhorse bridge, known as the "Bishop's Bridge" has spanned the burn since the 17th century and still stands close to a more modern road bridge.

A feature of the village is its 18th-century statue of "The Provost". It is thought to depict the Rev. Thomas Buchanan (related to the 17th-century theologian George Buchanan), who became the last church provost of Ceres in 1578.  The figure portrays him as a toby jug and is possibly satirical. The sculptor, a local stonemason named James Howie, also carved a panel below the figure depicting the Battle of Bannockburn.

The village is dominated by the Parish Church. It has what is possibly the shortest High Street in Scotland - just a few houses on each side. In a prominent position by the Bow Butts is a monument commemorating the men of Ceres who fought in the Battle of Bannockburn in 1314.  It was erected on the six hundredth anniversary of the battle, in 1914.

The Italian balloonist Vincenzo Lunardi landed in the parish after his first flight in Scotland in 1785. Fetched from a field near Pitscottie, he was greeted in the village where his flag was carried in procession and the church bell rung in his honour.

While agriculture remains important to the local economy, many local residents now commute to work in nearby towns and cities such as Perth, Cupar, Dundee, St. Andrews and Glenrothes. A pottery in the village has revived the manufacture of traditional Fife Wemyss Ware.

Folk Museum
The Fife Folk Museum is located in the village in a range of buildings including the old weigh-house where grain was weighed at a tron on market days. The building also served as a tolbooth for locking up minor offenders and the village jougs are still attached. The museum commemorates rural life of a bygone era. The museum began in 1968 in the renovation and conversion of the former weigh-house and adjoining cottages through an initiative by Cupar & North Fife Preservation Society. A fundraising campaign in 2003-4 enabled a £395,000 project to renovate the Museum.

Origin of the name
The village name signifies "place to the west" from the Scottish Gaelic Siar meaning "west", probably in relation to St Andrews Locational endings in -es are common in East Fife.  Suggestions that the name originated from an early dedication of the local kirk, such as to "Saint Siris", Saint Cyrus or Saint Cyricus are now discounted.

Ceres was the name of the Roman goddess of agriculture and grain. The name has led to contact with Ceres, Italy (visited by the local pipe band in the 1970s) and Ceres, Western Cape, South Africa (with which gifts were exchanged in the 1990s).

The parish of Ceres has some biblical place names: Babylon near Muirhead, south of Craigrothie, and Sodom and Gomorrah (locally pronounced Gemorrie) and Purgatory on the road to Pitscottie.  There are now no dwellings at these locations.  On the other hand, there is a place called Paradise, which now habited, just over the boundary in Cults parish.

Ceres Games
The Ceres Games are said to have been held every year since 1314 after Robert the Bruce granted the village permission to hold them in commemoration of its men's participation in the Battle of Bannockburn. Now staged in the form of Highland games, they are the oldest free games in Scotland.

Craighall

Parish church

The current parish church was built in 1806 to a design by Alexander Leslie, replacing a medieval building. A tower and octagonal spire were added in the 1850s. Apart from the addition of electric lighting and two early 20th-century stained glass windows (either side of the central pulpit), the interior is substantially unaltered from when first built and retains the gallery and original wooden box pews.

Within the vestibule of the church a late medieval effigy of a knight which was originally in the ancient church is preserved on a modern stand.  It is extremely well preserved and shows interesting details of 15th-century armour.

There is a mausoleum in the cemetery which was established by the widow of Robert 9th Lord Lindsay and is called "Lady Boyd's House" as she subsequently married the 6th Lord Boyd of Kilmarnock. However, the vault contains the grave of John Lindsay, 20th Earl of Crawford (1702-1749).

Ceres Church  is within the Church of Scotland Presbytery of St Andrews. In 1983, the parish of Ceres was linked (and later united) with the neighbouring parish of Springfield. This united parish was further united with Kemback in 2005, although the three church buildings are retained. There is a service in Ceres every Sunday at 11.15 am except on Remembrance Sunday (10:45am) and the fifth Sunday of any month, when a united service is held in rotation at Ceres, Kemback or Springfield at 11am.

One serving past minister of Ceres has been Moderator of the General Assembly of the Church of Scotland (1588): Thomas Buchanan, said to be the subject of "The Provost" sculpture, in the village centre. However, the sculpture is an amalgam of parts: the upper section is clearly a Toby Jug and therefore cannot pre-date 1760; the word PROVOST has been added by a different hand and appears to be a joke aimed an intemperate provost; the overall frame is indeed 16th or early 17th century and contains a worn but highly interesting hunting scene.

The present Minister is the Rev Jane Barron.

Notable persons
 Patrick Adamson (1537–1592), Archbishop of St Andrews
 Rev. Robert Arnot (1744–1808), Professor of Divinity and Moderator of the General Assembly of the Church of Scotland
Rev Thomas Buchanan (d. 1599) minister of Ceres 1578 to 1599, Moderator of the General Assembly of the Church of Scotland in 1588
 Sir William Dalgleish (1832–1913), businessman and benefactor
Jenny Gilruth MSP, MSP for Mid Fife and Glenrothes from 2016
 Robert Fleming Gourlay (1788–1863), polemicist and author of the "Statistical Account of Upper Canada", 1822
 Rev. Thomas Halyburton (1674–1712), divine
 Sir Thomas Hope, 1st Baronet, (1573–1646), Lord Advocate
 Andrew Lemoncello (born 1982), long distance runner
 Sir Robert Lindsay of Pitscottie (c. 1532–1580), chronicler
 Jimmy Methven, (1868–1953), Derby County FC player and manager
 Rev. Matthew Ross (born 1967), parish minister
 Sir John Scott of Scotstarvet (1585–1670), lawyer, statesman and author of The Staggering State of Scots Statesmen
 William Montgomery Watt (1909–2006), Islamicist
 James Wilson (1742–1798), signatory to the United States Declaration of Independence

References

External links

History of Ceres, Fife

Villages in Fife
Parishes in Fife